Daseochaeta is a genus of moths of the family Noctuidae. The genus was described by Warren in 1907.

The majority of species of this genus are currently under the valid genus Diphtherocome.

Some species of this genus are:
Daseochaeta mckeanae Cockerell, 1930 (from Thailand)
Daseochaeta verbenata Distant 1898
Daseochaeta viridis (Leech, 1889) (from Japan)

Former species of this genus:
Daseochaeta autumnalis Chang, 1991 (from Taiwan)
Daseochaeta brevipennis (from Tibet)
Daseochaeta metaphaea Hampson 1909 (from western China)
Daseochaeta pulchra Wileman, 1912 (from Taiwan)

References

Hreblay, M. & Kononenko, V. S. (1999). "The Chinese species of the Diphterocome pallida and D. discibrunnea species-groups (Lepidoptera, Noctuidae, Acronictinae) in the collection of the Zoologisches Forschungsinstitut und Museum Alexander Koenig, Bonn". Esperiana Buchreihe zur Entomologie. 7: 669-686.

Psaphidinae